DnaJ homolog subfamily A member 1 is a protein that in humans is encoded by the DNAJA1 gene.

Interactions
DNAJA1 has been shown to interact with PTTG1.

References

Further reading

Heat shock proteins